Suburbia, also known as Rebel Streets and The Wild Side, is a 1984 American coming-of-age drama/thriller film written and directed by Penelope Spheeris and produced by Roger Corman. The film's plot concerns a group of suburban youths who run away from home and adopt a punk lifestyle by squatting in abandoned suburban tract homes. The punks are played by Chris Pedersen, Bill Coyne, Timothy Eric O'Brien, Red Hot Chili Peppers bassist Flea and others.

The film contains live footage of D.I. performing "Richard Hung Himself", T.S.O.L. performing "Wash Away" and "Darker My Love" and the Vandals performing "The Legend of Pat Brown."

The film inspired the Pet Shop Boys song "Suburbia."

Plot
Sheila, a hitchhiking teenage runaway, is picked up on Interstate 605 in the Greater Los Angeles Area by a woman with a toddler. When the car gets a flat tire, they find a telephone booth on the edge of an abandoned tract housing district. While the mother is on the phone, the toddler is attacked and killed by a stray dog.

Another teenage runaway, Evan Johnson, leaves his suburban home and abusive, alcoholic mother, ending up at a punk rock concert by D.I., where Keef slips drugs into his drink. The concert ends abruptly when a female attendee has her clothes torn off by the punks in the audience. Jack Diddley offers Evan a place to stay at "T.R. House", a punk house in the abandoned tract housing district off Interstate 605. Along the way, they pick up Joe Schmo, who also intends to move into the house. Joe changes his mind when he learns each resident must be branded with the letters T.R. ("The Rejected"), but winds up coming back and accepting the brand. He begins to form a romantic relationship with Sheila, who has also moved into the house.

The next morning, several men from "Citizens Against Crime", including Jim Tripplett and Bob Skokes, drive through the neighborhood shooting at the packs of wild dogs that roam the area. T.R. kids Razzle and Skinner confront them, but the situation is defused by Jack's stepfather, police officer Bill Rennard. Jack, Evan, and Skinner steal food for the house by raiding the garages of a nearby suburban neighborhood, and they make further enemies of Jim and Bob by disrupting their garage sale. When Evan sees on the news that his mother has been arrested for drunk driving, he collects his younger brother, Ethan, and brings him to live at T.R. House, where Sheila gives him a mohawk. Sheila admits to Joe that she was physically and sexually abused by her father.

During a T.S.O.L. concert, the T.R. gang get into a fight defending Skinner. The men with whom they were fighting enter the concert and stab a security guard, framing the T.R. kids for the crime by using the knife to hang a flier with "T.R." written in blood. Jim and Bob next witness the T.R. crew vandalizing a convenience store. At a Citizens Against Crime meeting, they accuse Bill and the rest of the police of not doing enough to curb the teenagers' criminal behavior, declaring their willingness to take the law into their own hands. Bill goes to T.R. House and implores the teens to stay out of trouble. That night, Jim and Bob invade the house and threaten the teens, assaulting Sheila in the process. The next morning, the kids find that Sheila has killed herself by overdosing on Keef's drugs. Not knowing what to do, they bring her body back to her parents. When the T.R. kids come to the funeral, Sheila's father insists that they leave. Joe reveals his knowledge of Sheila's abuse, and a fight breaks out, hospitalizing Sheila's father.

At a Vandals concert that night, Bill shows up and warns the T.R. kids to clear out of T.R. house immediately, before their actions bring the Citizens Against Crime down on their heads, but they decide to stay. Learning of the violence at the funeral, Jim and Bob show up at the house and are attacked by the teens, who drive them off. They bring their car back around for another pass, accidentally running over and killing Ethan. Bill arrives, but is too late to prevent the tragedy.

Cast
 Bill Coyne as Evan Johnson
 Chris Pedersen as Jack Diddley
 Jennifer Clay as Sheila
 Timothy Eric O'Brien as Skinner
 Wade Walston as Joe Schmo
 Mike B. The Flea as Razzle
 André Boutilier as Peg Leg 
 Grant Miner as Keef
 Christina Beck as T'resa
 Maggie Ehrig as Mattie
 Lee Frederick (credited as "Robert Peyton") as Jim Tripplett
 Jeff Prettyman as Bob Skokes
 Don Allen as Officer Bill Rennard
 Andrew Pece as Ethan Johnson
 J. Dinan Myrtetus as Sheila's father
 Ilene Latter as Sheila's mother
 Donna Lamana as Tina Johnson
 Gavin Courtney as Joe's father
 Gina Carrera (credited as "Julie Winchester") as Sandy Dawson
 Marlena Brause as Mrs. Tripplett
 Dorlinda Griffin as Mother
 Robert Griffin as Toddler

Cameos
 D.I. (Casey Royer, Fredric Taccone, Tim Maag, Derek O'Brien)
 T.S.O.L. (Jack Grisham, Ron Emory, Mike Roche, Todd Barnes, Greg Kuehn)
 The Vandals (Steve O, Jan Ackerman, Joseph Escalante, Steve Pfauter)

Production
Director Penelope Spheeris recruited street youths and punk-rock musicians to play each role rather than hiring actors.

Reception
Vincent Canby called the film a "clear-eyed, compassionate melodrama about a bunch of young dropouts" and "probably the best teen-agers-in-revolt movie since Jonathan Kaplan's Over the Edge."

Suburbia holds a 93% rating on Rotten Tomatoes based on 15 reviews.

Home media
The film was included as part of Shout! Factory's Roger Corman Cult Classics series, reissued on DVD in May 2010. It was made available for streaming on the Criterion Channel as part of a collection of films directed by women.

References

External links
 
 
 
 Suburbia Community
 Criterion Channel

1984 films
1984 drama films
1980s coming-of-age drama films
1980s thriller drama films
American coming-of-age drama films
American independent films
American thriller drama films
Child sexual abuse in fiction
Films about dysfunctional families
Films directed by Penelope Spheeris
Films produced by Roger Corman
Films set in California
Films shot in California
New World Pictures films
Punk films
Squatting in film
Squatting in the United States
1980s English-language films
1980s American films